The 1952–53 Sheffield Shield season was the 51st season of the Sheffield Shield, the domestic first-class cricket competition of Australia. South Australia won the championship.

Table

Statistics

Most Runs
Ken Mackay 443

Most Wickets
Geff Noblet 41

References

Sheffield Shield
Sheffield Shield
Sheffield Shield seasons